Charlie Lawrence is an American sitcom television series created by Jeffrey Richman, that aired on CBS from June 15 until July 13, 2003.

Premise
A gay actor gets elected to congress as a representative from New Mexico.

Cast
Nathan Lane as Charlie Lawrence
Laurie Metcalf as Sarah Dolecek
Ted McGinley as Graydon Cord
Stephanie Faracy as Suzette Michaels
T.R. Knight as Ryan Lemming

Episodes

Reception
Reviews for Charlie Lawrence were mostly negative. Alessandra Stanley of The New York Times called the political satire "mild and formulaic.

The first episode of Charlie Lawrence'' got a rating of 0.9 in the 18- to 49-year-old demographic.

References

External links

2003 American television series debuts
2003 American television series endings
2000s American LGBT-related comedy television series
2000s American sitcoms
American LGBT-related sitcoms
CBS original programming
English-language television shows
Gay-related television shows
Television shows set in Washington, D.C.
Television series by CBS Studios
Television series by 20th Century Fox Television